Karol Skórkowski (1768–1851) was a Polish bishop. Elected bishop of Kraków in 1828, his election was confirmed in 1829 and he was consecrated in early 1830.

Supporter of the November Uprising (1830–1831). After the fall of the uprising, he was arrested by the Russian government. Vatican, pressured by Moscow, forced him to leave Kraków; he would find sanctuary in Opava (Vatican however did not agree to remove him from his office). After his death in 1851, there would be no new bishop of Kraków until 1879.

1768 births
1851 deaths
Bishops of Kraków
19th-century Roman Catholic bishops in Poland